Christian Thomas may refer to:

Christian Thomasius (1655–1728), German jurist and theologian
Christian Thomas (long jumper) (born 1965), retired West German long jumper
Christian Thomas (Danish gymnast) (1896–1970), Danish gymnast
Christian Thomas (ice hockey) (born 1992), Canadian ice hockey player

See also
Saint Thomas Christians
Chris Thomas (disambiguation)
Kristian Thomas (born 1989), British gymnast